Buscando Una Sonrisa (Looking for a smile) is the title of the studio album released by Mexican singer José José in 1971.

At the same time of its release, José José debuts in cinema as an actor, in a film of the same name, some of the songs of the album were used as the soundtrack: "Buscando una sonrisa", "Hoy cuando tú no estás", "Llegaste a mi" and "Cosas imposibles".

Track listing
 Buscando una Sonrisa (Jonathan Zarzora)
 Sólo Amor (Rafael Macias Cruz)
 Llegaste a Mí (Eduardo Salas; Alfonso Ontiveros)
 Amor Mío (Álvaro Carrillo)
 En una tarde de verano (Eduardo Salas; Alfonso Ontiveros)
 Dos Rosas (Sergio Esquivel; Guillermo "Memo" Salamanca)
 Hoy Cuando ya no Estás (Eduardo Salas; Alfonso Ontiveros)
 Cosas Imposibles (Armando Manzanero)
 La Primera Vez (Enrique Navarro)
 La Barca (Roberto Cantoral)

1971 albums
José José albums
Spanish-language albums
RCA Records albums